Goli Kand (also Romanized as Golī Kand; also known as Kolī Kand) is a village in Sarajuy-ye Sharqi Rural District, Saraju District, Maragheh County, East Azerbaijan Province, Iran. At the 2006 census, its population was 223, in 43 families.

References 

Towns and villages in Maragheh County